Prospect Island is a small island in the San Joaquin River delta, in California. It is part of Solano County, and managed by Reclamation District 1667. It appears on a 1952 USGS map; by 1978, survey maps show it cut diagonally by the Sacramento River Deep Water Ship Channel.

Gallery

References

Islands of Solano County, California
Islands of the Sacramento–San Joaquin River Delta
Islands of Northern California